Dance Hall is a 1941 American comedy film directed by Irving Pichel and written by Stanley Rauh and Ethel Hill. The film stars Carole Landis, Cesar Romero, William "Bill" Henry, June Storey, J. Edward Bromberg and Charles Halton. It is based on the novel The Giant Swing by W. R. Burnett. The film was released on July 18, 1941 by 20th Century Fox.

Plot

Singer Lili Brown is attracted to dance-hall manager Duke until she realizes that he is a ladies' man. Nice guy Duke matches her with composer Joe Brooks.

Cast   
Carole Landis as Lily Brown
Cesar Romero as Duke McKay
William "Bill" Henry as Joe Brooks
June Storey as Ada
J. Edward Bromberg as Max Brandon
Charles Halton as Mr. Frederick Newmeyer
Shimen Ruskin as Charles 'Limpy' Larkin
William Haade as Moon
Trudi Marsdon as Vivian
Russ Clark as Cook
Frank Fanning as Turnkey

References

External links 
 

1941 films
20th Century Fox films
American comedy films
1941 comedy films
Films based on American novels
Films based on works by W. R. Burnett
Films directed by Irving Pichel
American black-and-white films
1940s English-language films
1940s American films